Summer of Sam is a 1999 American crime thriller film about the 1977 David Berkowitz (Son of Sam) serial murders and their effect on a group of fictional residents of an Italian-American neighborhood in The Bronx in the late 1970s. The killer, David Berkowitz, his murders and the investigation are shown in the film, but the focus is on two young men from the neighborhood: Vinny (John Leguizamo), whose marriage is faltering due to his cheating, and Ritchie (Adrien Brody), Vinny's childhood friend who has embraced punk fashion and music.

The murder investigation and other contemporary events, such as the New York City blackout of 1977 and the New York Yankees' winning season, provide a backdrop to the stories of Vinny, Ritchie, their families and friends. The film was directed and co-produced by Spike Lee, who also co-wrote the film with Michael Imperioli and Victor Colicchio.

Plot
It is the summer of 1977, and New York City lives in fear of the ".44 Caliber Killer", who shoots young women and their male companions. The killer, David Berkowitz, later identifies himself as "Son of Sam" in a note left at a murder scene. Berkowitz lives in a messy apartment, where he is driven crazy by the barking of a neighbor's large black labrador, Harvey, the dog of Sam Carr, and has a vision of the dog directing him to kill.

In an Italian-American neighborhood in the Bronx (likely Morris Park, Throggs Neck, or Pelham Bay), hairdresser Vinny and his pretty wife Dionna go disco dancing at a local nightclub, where they meet Dionna's attractive cousin Chiara. Vinny offers to drive Chiara home while Dionna remains at the club. Vinny and Chiara then park on a residential street and have sex in the car. Son of Sam watches them but is scared off when the couple accidentally set off the car horn during sex and quickly drive away, embarrassed. After they leave, Son of Sam kills another couple who had parked behind Vinny. When Vinny picks up Dionna back at the club, she notices the smell of vaginal lubrication on his face and realizes he had sex with Chiara but does not let on that she knows.

On the drive home, Vinny notices police near the location where he had parked with Chiara and sees the bodies of the slain couple. The religious and guilty Vinny, realizing he could have been a victim, decides that God spared him in order to give him a chance to reform his ways and stop cheating on his wife. Although Vinny loves Dionna, their sex life is suffering because Vinny enjoys anal sex, "69" and other sex acts that he considers kinky, but he cannot bring himself to discuss or perform with his wife. He is also having an affair with Gloria, the owner of the hair salon where he works.

The next day, while Vinny is hanging out with neighborhood drug dealer Joey T and his friends, Vinny's old friend Ritchie, who has been away for some time, reappears, sporting a punk spiked hairdo and clothing and affecting a British accent. Vinny, Joey T, and the others dislike the change in Ritchie and he soon finds himself unwelcome in the neighborhood. Ruby, a promiscuous local girl, is attracted to Ritchie and the two begin a relationship. Unlike other men, Ritchie takes an interest in Ruby as a person, not just as a sexual outlet. She learns that he makes money by erotic dancing and prostituting himself at a gay theater but remains loyal to him and begins to dress in punk fashion herself.

As the Son of Sam killings continue, tension rises in the neighborhood. A local police detective asks the local mob boss to help him find the killer; Joey T and his friends also make a list of possible suspects, including Ritchie whom they regard as "a freak". Ritchie and Ruby invite Vinny and Dionna to come see their punk band perform at CBGB, but once there, Dionna feels intimidated by the punk crowd and refuses to go in. Vinny and Dionna instead go to Studio 54, where they are denied entry and finally end up at Plato's Retreat where they take drugs and participate in an orgy. Vinny becomes upset when he sees Dionna appearing to enjoy the experience of having sex with another man, even though he himself is having sex with other women. He berates Dionna in the car on the way home, causing her to get mad and reveal that she knows he cheated on her with Chiara. She storms off to stay at her father's house. Vinny begins to drink, uses drugs and makes a scene at Gloria's hair salon, causing her to angrily throw him out and then inform Dionna about their affair. Upon hearing from Gloria, Dionna leaves Vinny for good.

Joey T and his gang decide that the latest witness sketch of Son of Sam released by the police resembles Ritchie and attempt to track him down at CBGB. Joey persuades the unstable Vinny, who is high on drugs he has taken to dull the pain of his impending divorce, to help them lure Ritchie out of his house, since Vinny is the only local friend Ritchie still trusts. Unbeknownst to Vinny and his friends, the police have already arrested David Berkowitz, the real Son of Sam.  Vinny goes to Ritchie's family home, where Ritchie and Ruby are packing up to leave town, and lures Ritchie out on the pretext of talking about his failing marriage. Once Ritchie is outside, Vinny warns Ritchie under his breath to run, but Ritchie does not heed the warning and is attacked and severely beaten by Joey T and his gang. Ritchie's stepfather, Eddie, emerges from the house brandishing his gun and rescues the badly injured Ritchie, telling the attackers that Ritchie is not the Son of Sam and that the TV news is reporting that the police have just arrested the real killer. Unable to face Ritchie, Vinny walks away.

Cast

Production
The role of Dionna was originally written with Jennifer Esposito in mind. The role of Ruby was originally offered to Sarah Michelle Gellar. A cast reshuffle ended with Mira Sorvino as Dionna and Esposito as Ruby. Journalist Jimmy Breslin, to whom the real Son of Sam sent letters during the time of the murders, appears as himself introducing and closing the film. Phil Rizzuto appears in the film as the Yankees' broadcaster and boxer Evander Holyfield makes a brief appearance as a man in a riot.

The film was largely shot during the summer of 1998 and set in the Italian-American neighborhoods of Country Club, Morris Park and Throggs Neck sections of the Bronx, with some scenes filmed in Brownsville, Brooklyn. Although most of the Son of Sam murders actually took place in Queens, the double shooting that Vinny narrowly escapes has been called an accurate depiction of the April 1977 killing of Alexander Esau and Valentina Suriani in the Bronx. Marie's Beauty Lounge, the salon where Vinny works, was a real salon on Morris Park Avenue, between Williamsbridge Road and Bronxdale Avenue. The real CBGB club was also used; the band L.E.S. Stitches shown playing there was a contemporary punk band from New York's Lower East Side.

Adrien Brody's nose was broken during the climactic fight scene in which his character Ritchie is brutally beaten by his friends. The sex orgy scene at Plato's Retreat included more explicit shots in the original cut but was edited after the MPAA threatened the film with an "NC-17" rating.

Reception
Summer of Sam premiered at the Cannes Film Festival on May 20, 1999, and was released in the United States on July 2. It received mixed reviews from critics. The film has an approval rating of 50% at Rotten Tomatoes based on 104 reviews, with a weighted average of 5.50/10. The site's consensus states: "Spike Lee offers intense visuals but his storytelling feels crowded and overambitious". On Metacritic, the film has a score of 67 out of 100 based on reviews from 26 critics, indicating "generally favorable reviews". Audiences surveyed by CinemaScore gave the film a grade D− on scale of A to F.

According to film academic R. Barton Palmer in 2011, it continues to be widely viewed as Spike Lee's most controversial film, "issuing a cynical appeal to trashy tastes", which has "prevented some critics from according it more than cursory consideration". Many critics objected to its frankly unromantic, starkly realistic (if hardly pornographic, in the usual sense) handling of sexual themes, as well as for its pervasive street language" and "what some saw as [Lee's] bitterly negative and even defamatory representations of white ethnic culture". Reviewing the film in 1999, Kenneth Turan of the Los Angeles Times stated "Lee is a powerful filmmaker who certainly knows how to have an impact on an audience, but those who survive his ministrations are likely to wonder if in this case the battle was worth the bruises".

More positive was Todd McCarthy of Variety, who thought "this is the closest Lee has yet come to Scorsese territory!" In the Chicago Sun-Times, Roger Ebert gave it three-and-a-half out of four stars and regarded the screenplay as more of "an analytical outsider's view" of provincial scapegoating rather than "the inside, autobiographical job of a Martin Scorsese film". In the spirit of Lee's best work, Summer of Sam "vibrates with fear, guilt and lust", Ebert wrote. "It's not about the killer, but about his victims—not those he murdered, but those whose overheated imaginations bloomed into a lynch mob mentality. There is a sequence near the end of the film that shows a side of human nature as ugly as it is familiar: the fever to find someone to blame and the need to blame someone who is different."

Accolades

References

External links
 
 
 

1999 films
1990s crime drama films
1999 crime thriller films
40 Acres and a Mule Filmworks films
Adultery in films
American crime drama films
American crime thriller films
American serial killer films
Drama films based on actual events
1990s English-language films
Films about Italian-American culture
Films scored by Terence Blanchard
Films about male prostitution in the United States
Films directed by Spike Lee
Films shot in New York City
Films set in 1977
Films set in the Bronx
1990s Italian-language films
Punk films
Films with screenplays by Spike Lee
Crime films based on actual events
Touchstone Pictures films
Cultural depictions of David Berkowitz
1999 drama films
Films produced by Jon Kilik
1999 multilingual films
American multilingual films
Italian-language American films
1990s American films